Soleymanabad (also Romanized as Soleymānābād and Soleiman Abad; also known as Sulaimānābād) is a village in Mohammadabad Rural District, in the Central District of Zarand County, Kerman Province, Iran. At the 2006 census, its population was 848, in 199 families.

References 

Populated places in Zarand County